James Benjamin Linder  (October 13, 1925 – April 7, 2009) was a flag officer and highly decorated Naval Aviator in the United States Navy. He served in both the Korean War and Vietnam War.

He was the last commander of the United States Taiwan Defense Command. He retired as a Rear Admiral and is one of the top 25 most decorated American veterans.

Biography
Linder was born on October 13, 1925 in Osceola, Iowa.

On 11 May 1966, he was awarded the Silver Star for leading the squadron on a strike against a mobile SAM site at Thanh Hóa, North Vietnam.  After earning the Navy Cross and Silver Star in combat, he earned a Second, Third, and Fourth Silver Star over a period of three consecutive days.

He was the last Commander of the U.S. Taiwan Defense Command and he oversaw the termination of the official command and closing down of all subordinate commands as well, due to switching of diplomatic relations from the Republic of China to the People's Republic of China. In 1979, he served as Special Assistant to the Commander-in-Chief of Pacific Command Admiral Donald C. Davis until his retirement on August 31, 1979.

Later life
Linder was married to Patricia Joy Weir on June 9, 1949 at Mount Pleasant, Iowa. They had a son and daughter; three grandchildren and four great-grandchildren. After his retirement from Navy, they settled in Southwestern United States.

Linder died on April 7, 2009 in Oro Valley, Arizona and is buried at Forest Home Cemetery at Mount Pleasant, Iowa.

Ships and fighter squadrons RADM Linder served with or commanded

Awards and decorations
Included among his awards for valor and service, in addition to receiving the Navy Cross, Linder was decorated with the Silver Star four times, a Defense Superior Service Medal, four Legions of Merit, seven Distinguished Flying Crosses, a Bronze Star Medal, and twenty four Air Medals.

Navy Cross citation

Linder, James Benjamin
Commander, U.S Navy
Carrier Air Wing FIFTEEN, USS CORAL SEA (CVA-43)
Date of Action: 28 September 1967

Citation:
For extraordinary heroism in aerial flight on 28 September 1967 as Commander, Carrier Air Wing FIFTEEN, embarked in USS Coral Sea (CVA-43). Commander Linder planned, led, and directed an air-wing striking force consisting of thirty-one aircraft against the heavily defended and strategically important Haiphong railway/highway bridge in North Vietnam. Although subjected to intense and accurate barrages of multi-caliber antiaircraft-artillery fire, surface-to-air missiles, and enemy interceptor aircraft, he fearlessly and skillfully directed and controlled the striking forces assigned, resolutely pressing home a devastating attack with resulted in total destruction of the bridge and marked the culmination of the comprehensive attack plan to isolate the city. As the leader of four of the previous assaults on the strategic Haiphong bridge complex, Commander Linder, by his courageous leadership, comprehensive planning, and outstanding airmanship, contributed greatly to the total success of this daring and expansive attack strategy. Tactics which were planned and executed by Commander Linder encompassed over one hundred and fifty attack sorties and were consummated in the face of scores of accurate surface-to-air missile firings and fusillades of antiaircraft fire concentrated at the targets. Despite the enemy's determined and formidable opposition, the logistic lifeline of Haiphong was effectively severed by the destruction of these key bridges without the loss of a single strike aircraft. Commander Linder's brilliant planning, consummate flight leadership, and fearless devotion to duty in the face of grave personal danger were in keeping with the highest traditions of the United States Naval Service.

References

1925 births
2009 deaths
People from Mount Pleasant, Iowa
United States Naval Academy alumni
Recipients of the Navy Cross (United States)
Recipients of the Silver Star
Recipients of the Distinguished Flying Cross (United States)
Recipients of the Air Medal
United States Navy rear admirals (upper half)
United States Navy personnel of the Korean War
United States Navy personnel of the Vietnam War
Recipients of the Legion of Merit
Recipients of the Gallantry Cross (Vietnam)
Military personnel from Iowa